Pernille Rose Grønkjær (born in 1973 in Denmark) is a Danish film director.

Grønkjær graduated from the National Film School of Denmark in 1997.  She is the director of various documentary films for the screen and for television including , Repeating Grandpa (selected for Input 2002 at Rotterdam), and The Monastery: Mr. Vig and the Nun, winner of the Joris Ivens competition at IDFA 2006.

References

External links 
 

1973 births
Danish documentary film directors
Danish women film directors
Living people
Place of birth missing (living people)
Women documentary filmmakers